Ardell F. Brede (born June 23, 1939) is an American politician who served as mayor of Rochester, Minnesota. Born in Austin, Minnesota, Brede has lived in Rochester for 43 years. Brede was the mayor of Rochester from January 6, 2003 until January 7, 2019. He was preceded by Chuck Canfield.  On November 6, 2018, Kim Norton was elected as his successor. Before he was elected, he worked as an administrator for the Mayo Clinic.

Biography

Ardell Brede became Mayor of Rochester Minnesota on January 6, 2003.  Prior to being elected, Mayor Brede held numerous positions at the Rochester Methodist Hospital, and the Mayo Clinic of Rochester.

Brede was born on June 23, 1939 in Austin, Minnesota.  He received an Associate Degree in commerce from the Austin Junior College in 1959 and took several graduate courses in the University of Minnesota Extension Division program.  Brede has also attended management classes and seminars at Brigham Young University and the Rochester Methodist Hospital/Mayo Clinic Rochester.

He was married to his wife Judy from 1961 until her death in 2018. They had three children: Leslie Kennedy, Scott Brede, and Jennifer Brede.

Politics
Brede is politically unaffiliated but endorsed Hillary Clinton in the 2016 United States presidential election, and has previously endorsed DFL governor Mark Dayton and congressman Tim Walz. Brede has also opposed voter ID laws, urging rejection of a proposed Minnesota constitutional amendment that would require voters to show photo ID, calling it "unnecessary" and "extreme."

See also
List of mayors of Rochester, Minnesota

References

1939 births
Living people
Mayors of Rochester, Minnesota
21st-century American politicians